"We'll Be Coming Back" is a song by Scottish record producer Calvin Harris, featuring English singer Example. The song was released on 2 June 2012 as the fourth single from Harris' third studio album, 18 Months (2012). The song spent two weeks at number two (held off by Wiley's "Heatwave" for both its weeks at number one) on the UK Singles Chart, becoming Harris' fourth consecutive number-two single in the United Kingdom. In Ireland, the song debuted at number one, becoming Example's first number-one single and Harris' second (first as a lead artist) in the country. It also featured as the final track on Example's fourth studio album, The Evolution of Man (2012).

Composition
Beginning with a melodic guitar-driven introduction, "We'll Be Coming Back" transitions into a "hard electro synth-fuelled chorus" featuring Example's vocals. The repeated hook "We didn't wanna call it too early / Now it seems a world away, but I miss that day / Are we ever gonna feel the same?" contains similar notes as the chorus of Aerosmith's "I Don't Want to Miss a Thing".

Music video
Directed by Saman Kesh and filmed in the Hollywood Hills overlooking Los Angeles, California in June 2012, the music video for "We'll Be Coming Back" stars Harris and Example as robbers. After burying what they've stolen, the two return at a later time to retrieve the goods to find that a female police officer, riding a 2009 Yamaha YZF-R1, who had been tracking them has gotten there first, leaving behind her badge as evidence. In addition to the robbery, the video features a series of high-speed car chases and police confrontations. The video ends with Calvin and Example pursuing the officer on the bike.

Speaking to Capital in June 2012, Harris stated that they both wanted to "look cool" in the music video for "We'll Be Coming Back," and went on to say of the video premise: "we've got flash cars and it's the old two day trip to LA option." With Example driving a 1973 Porsche 911 T and Harris driving a  Ferrari 512 BB, several expensive cars were damaged during the filming of the video. The video for "We'll Be Coming Back" premiered on 6 July 2012.

Critical reception
The song has been called the "soundtrack to the summer" by Music News, and a "summer anthem" by the Westmeath Examiner. Digital Spy gave the track a mixed review, describing it as "mildly enjoyable" but "a little stale."

Track listing

Charts

Weekly charts

Year-end charts

Certifications

Release history

References

2012 singles
2012 songs
Calvin Harris songs
Columbia Records singles
Example (musician) songs
Irish Singles Chart number-one singles
Number-one singles in Scotland
Songs written by Calvin Harris
Songs written by Example (musician)